Robert Dowd may refer to:

 Robert Dowd (artist) (1936–1996), American artist
 Robert Dowd (ice hockey) (born 1988), English ice hockey player